Alta Valle Intelvi is a comune (municipality) in the Province of Como in the Italian region Lombardy. It was created on 1 January 2017 after the merger of the former comuni of Lanzo d'Intelvi, Pellio Intelvi and Ramponio Verna.

Main sights
The Balcone d'Italia, located in the area of Lanzo d'Intelvi, is a   mountain view-point with extensive views over Lake Lugano and the city of Lugano, to the high Alps. It can be reached by road from Lanzo d'Intelvi.

References

External links
 Official website

2017 establishments in Italy
Populated places established in 2017
Cities and towns in Lombardy